Lucasta can refer to:

Surname

Anna Lucasta (play)
Anna Lucasta (1949 film)
Anna Lucasta (1958 film)

Given name

Lucasta Miller, English writer and literary journalist
Lucasta, subject of the 1649 poem To Lucasta, Going to the Warres
Lucasta, character in Tanner Hall (film)